Bacax is a local god from the Roman-North African region. Thought to have been a god of caves, Bacax is known from inscriptions at Cirta (Constantine, Algeria).

References 
Encyclopedia of Gods, Michael Jordan, Kyle Cathie Limited, 2002

African gods